"It Doesn't Matter" is the first single released from Haitian rapper Wyclef Jean's second studio album, The Ecleftic: 2 Sides II a Book (2000). Written by Jean and Jerry Duplessis, the track features additional vocals from Melky Sedeck and wrestler The Rock, whose famous catchphrase inspired the song title. The track also includes samples of "Mona Lisa" by Slick Rick, "This Is Ska" by Longsy D, "Livin' la Vida Loca" by Ricky Martin, and "Take Me Home, Country Roads" by John Denver, so all songwriters are given credits.

Upon its release on 26 June 2000, the song reached number 80 on the US Billboard Hot R&B/Hip-Hop Singles & Tracks chart. In September 2000, the song entered the UK Singles Chart at number three and spent 11 weeks in the top 100. "It Doesn't Matter" was also released in French under the title "Ça ne me fait rien" for Quebec and French radio stations, with Jacky and Ben-J providing additional vocals. Some lyrics were changed for this version.

Track listings
US 12-inch single 
A1. "It Doesn't Matter" (LP version featuring The Rock and Melky Sedeck) – 4:02
A2. "It Doesn't Matter" (instrumental) – 3:56
A3. "It Doesn't Matter" (a cappella featuring The Rock and Melky Sedeck) – 3:50
B1. "It Doesn't Matter" (remix featuring Hope) – 4:05
B2. "It Doesn't Matter" (remix instrumental) – 4:05
B3. "It Doesn't Matter" (remix a cappella featuring Hope) – 3:20
B4. "However You Want It" (LP version) – 3:03

UK CD1 
 "It Doesn't Matter" (LP version featuring The Rock and Melky Sedeck) – 3:57
 "It Doesn't Matter" (remix featuring Hope) – 4:05
 "Thug Angels" (LP version featuring Small World) – 6:35

UK CD2 
 "It Doesn't Matter" (LP version featuring The Rock and Melky Sedeck) – 3:57
 "We Trying to Stay Alive" (LP version) – 3:09
 "Younger Days" – 5:00

UK cassette single and European CD single 
 "It Doesn't Matter" (LP version featuring The Rock and Melky Sedeck) – 3:57
 "It Doesn't Matter" (remix featuring Hope) – 4:05

European maxi-CD single 
 "It Doesn't Matter" (LP version featuring The Rock and Melky Sedeck) – 4:02
 "It Doesn't Matter" (remix featuring Hope) – 4:05
 "It Doesn't Matter" (instrumental) – 3:56
 "However You Want It" (LP version) – 3:03

French CD single 
 "It Doesn't Matter" (LP version featuring the Rock and Melky Sedeck) – 4:02
 "It Doesn't Matter" (remix featuring Hope) – 4:05
 "Ça ne me fait rien" – 3:59

Credits and personnel
Credits and personnel are taken from The Ecleftic: 2 Sides II a Book album booklet.

Studios
 Recorded and mixed at The Hit Factory (New York City)
 Mastered at Sterling Sound (New York City)

Personnel

 Wyclef Jean – writing, vocals, production
 Jerry "Wonder" Duplessis – writing (as Jerry Duplessis), production
 Ricky Walters – writing ("Mona Lisa")
 Andrew Long – writing ("This Is Ska")
 Desmond Child – writing ("Livin' la Vida Loca")
 Robi Rosa – writing ("Livin' la Vida Loca")
 Taffy Danoff – writing ("Take Me Home, Country Roads")
 William Danoff – writing ("Take Me Home, Country Roads")
 John Denver – writing ("Take Me Home, Country Roads")
 The Rock – featured vocals
 Melky Sedeck – featured vocals
 Blandinna Melky Jean – vocals
 Farel Sedeck Guerschom Jean – co-production
 Robert Aaron – horns
 Andy Grassi – mixing, recording engineer, mastering
 Glen Marchese – recording engineer
 Chris Gehringer – mastering
 Serge "Sergical" Tsai – mastering

Charts

Weekly charts

Year-end charts

Release history

References

2000 singles
2000 songs
Columbia Records singles
Music videos directed by Hype Williams
Songs written by Desmond Child
Songs written by Draco Rosa
Songs written by Jerry Duplessis
Songs written by John Denver
Songs written by Wyclef Jean
Song recordings produced by Jerry Duplessis
Song recordings produced by Wyclef Jean
Wyclef Jean songs